Miss Rajasthan  is an Indian state beauty pageant held annually in Rajasthan, India. The Fusion Group has been organizing the beauty pageant.

Miss Rajasthan is not affiliated with Femina which has since 2017 introduced a new format for the selection of contestants for the Femina Miss India national beauty pageant. Femina holds a separate audition to crown a Femina Miss India Rajasthan winner to represent the state of Rajasthan at Femina Miss India.

Miss Rajasthan 2022 
The pageant was held on 6 August 2022 at Birla Auditorium, Jaipur, Rajasthan. Tarushee Rai from Jaipur was crowned the winner at the end of the event.

Final results

Miss Rajasthan 2021 
The pageant was held on 5 October 2021 at Birla Auditorium, Jaipur, Rajasthan. Mansi Rathore was crowned the winner at the end of the event.

Final results

Miss Rajasthan 2020

Miss Rajasthan 2019

Miss Rajasthan 2018

Miss Rajasthan 2017

Miss Rajasthan 2016

Miss Rajasthan 2015

External Links 

 Facebook
 Twitter
 Instagram

References 

Beauty pageants in India